Cesare, the Italian version of the given name Caesar, may refer to:

Given name
 Cesare, Marquis of Beccaria (1738–1794), an Italian philosopher and politician
 Cesare Airaghi (1840–1896), Italian colonel
 Cesare Arzelà (1847–1912), Italian mathematician
 Cesare Battisti (disambiguation)
 Cesare Bocci  (born 1957), Italian actor known for the Inspector Montalbano TV series
 Cesare Bonizzi, Franciscan friar and heavy metal singer
 Cesare Borgia (1475–1507), Italian general and statesman
 Cesare "Cece" Carlucci (1917–2008), American baseball umpire
 Cesare Emiliani (1922–1995), Italian-American scientist
 Cesare Fiorio (born 1939), Italian sportsperson
 Cesare Gianturco (1905–1995), Italian-American physician
 Cesare Nava (1861–1933), Italian engineer and politician
 Cesare Negri, the late Renaissance dancing-master
 Cesare Pavese (1908–1950), Italian poet and novelist
 Cesare Romiti (1923–2020), Italian economist and businessman
 Cesare Salvi (born 1948), Italian politician

Middle name 
 Giuseppe Cesare Abba (1838–1910), Italian patriot and writer
 Joe Cesare Colombo, Italian industrial designer

Surname 
 Oscar Cesare (1885–1948), Swedish-American cartoonist
 Adam Cesare, American horror novelist
 Giovanni Martino Cesare (c. 1590–1667), an Italian composer and cornett player.

See also
 Giulio Cesare (disambiguation)
 Cesare (manga), manga series by Souryo Fuyumi
 Cesare the Somnambulist, brainwashed murderer from the silent film The Cabinet of Dr. Caligari

Italian masculine given names

fr:César (prénom)
la:Caesar (cognomen)
hu:Cézár
pl:Cezar (imię)